Sir Vembakkam Comanduru Desikachariar (31 December 1861 – 14 November 1919) was an Indian lawyer, politician and Indian independence activist who served as a member of the Madras Legislative Council from 1904 to 1908. 

Desikachariar also participated in the 1898 Madras session of the Indian National Congress and introduced resolutions. He was the elder son of Vembakkam Rajagopacharlu, the younger brother of V. Sadagopacharlu. He was knighted in 1906.

References

Sources
 
Profile, TheHindu.com. Accessed 7 January 2023.

Knights Bachelor
Indian Knights Bachelor
1861 births
1919 deaths